Big Bright Cherry is a 1994 EP by Magnapop released promotionally in the United States by Play It Again Sam Records on Compact Disc (catalogue number DPRO 50803) and 10" gramophone record red vinyl (SPRO 50803.) Several of these songs also appear on the studio album Hot Boxing.

Track listing
All songs written by Linda Hopper and Ruthie Morris
"Puff" – 3:16
"Slowly, Slowly" – 3:36
"Slowly, Slowly" (Demo) – 3:41
"The Crush" – 3:21
"Here It Comes" – 2:49
"Merry" (Acoustic) – 3:22

Personnel
Magnapop
Linda Hopper – lead vocals
David McNair – drums
Ruthie Morris – guitar, backing vocals
Shannon Mulvaney – bass guitar

Technical staff
David Collins – remastering at A&M Studios
Magnapop – production on "Slowly, Slowly" (Demo) and "Merry" (Acoustic)
Ruth Leitman – art direction, photography
Bob Mould – production on "Slowly, Slowly", "The Crush", and "Here It Comes"
Ted Niceley – production on "Puff"
Valerie Raimonde – design
Jim Wilson – engineering

External links

Big Bright Cherry at Discogs

1994 EPs
Albums produced by Bob Mould
Magnapop EPs
PIAS Recordings EPs
Albums produced by Ted Niceley